The Northwestern Hawaiian Islands or Leeward Hawaiian Islands are a series of islands and atolls in the Hawaiian island chain located northwest of the islands of Kauai and Niihau. Politically, they are all part of Honolulu County in the U.S. state of Hawaii, except Midway Atoll, which is a territory distinct from the State of Hawaii, and grouped as one of the United States Minor Outlying Islands. The United States Census Bureau defines this area, except Midway, as Census Tract 114.98 of Honolulu County. All the islands except Nihoa are north of the Tropic of Cancer, making them the only islands in Hawaii that lie outside the tropics.

The Northwestern or Leeward Hawaiian Islands include:
Nihoa (Moku Manu) at 
Necker (Mokumanamana) at 
French Frigate Shoals (Kānemilohai) at 
Gardner Pinnacles (Pūhāhonu) at 
Maro Reef (Nalukākala) at 
Laysan (Kauō) at 
Lisianski (Papaāpoho) at 
Pearl and Hermes Atoll (Holoikauaua) at 
Midway Atoll (Pihemanu) at  - not part of the State of Hawaii
Kure Atoll (Mokupāpapa) at

The Islands

 Nihoa is the youngest of the NWHI, and the tallest, with  vertical cliffs. It represents the southwestern part of the island's former volcanic cone. Ancient Hawaiians might have stayed here long-term.
Barren of vegetation, it was used by Ancient Hawaiians for religious purposes, but not for long-term habitation.
The atoll is composed of a dozen or so small islands, one of which (Tern Island) contains an airport and human habitations.
 Gardner Pinnacles is made up of two small basalt peaks, the last rocky island in Hawaii. While the island itself is tiny, the surrounding reef is expansive and diverse.
 Maro Reef is an extremely fertile reef system that has been described as a "coral garden".
It has arguably the most diverse ecosystem in the NWHI, and hosts about two million seabirds of seventeen species.
 Lisianski Island, only , is geologically akin to Laysan, without the lake. Though the island is slightly less biodiverse, the surrounding reef is very fertile.
 Pearl and Hermes Atoll is an atoll very similar to French Frigate Shoals, but with much less dry land. For this reason, it was mostly ignored by guano miners and feather hunters.
 Midway Atoll is the most commonly known of the NWHI, and is also the largest. The Battle of Midway was fought here and in its surrounding waters, and the island remains permanently inhabited, albeit by persons who are there in consequence of their service with the United States Government, not an indigenous population.
 Circular Kure Atoll contains the  Green Island, which used to host a LORAN station and a runway, but these have since been demolished. Kure is one of the less biodiverse islands of the NWHI.

Other islands or reefs were previously mapped as part of this chain but are now considered to be either phantom islands or misidentifications of existing islands. The following reefs continued to appear on maps as late as 1934:
 Two Brothers Reef, site of the 1823 Two Brothers shipwreck, originally placed west of French Frigate Shoals but later proven to be identical with the latter.

As late as 1960, a German globe showed islands west of Kure Atoll that had long been proven nonexistent:
 Byers's Island
 Morrell's Island

Geology
The Northwestern Hawaiian Islands were formed approximately 7 to 30 million years ago, as shield volcanoes over the same volcanic hotspot that formed the Emperor Seamounts to the north and the Main Hawaiian Islands to the south. As the Pacific Plate moved north and later northwest over the hot spot, volcanic eruptions built up islands in a linear chain. The isolated land masses gradually eroded and subsided, evolving from high islands in the south, much like the Main Islands of Hawaii, to atolls (or seamounts) north of the Darwin Point. Each of the NWHI are in various stages of erosion. Nihoa, Necker, and Gardner Pinnacles are rocky, basalt islands that have not eroded enough to form an atoll, or that lack a substantial coral reef. Laysan and Lisianski are low, sandy islands that have been eroded longer. French Frigate Shoals, Pearl and Hermes, Midway, and Kure are atolls.

North of the Darwin Point, the coral reef grows more slowly than the island's subsidence, and as the Pacific Plate moves northwest, the island becomes a seamount when it crosses this line. Kure Atoll straddles the Darwin Point, and will sink beneath the ocean when its coral reef cannot keep up with the rate of subsidence, a destiny that awaits every Hawaiian island.

Biodiversity and Endemism

Only a species that could fly or swim immense distances could reach the archipelago. But whereas Polynesians, and later, Europeans, have largely altered the ecosystem of the Main Hawaiian islands by introducing alien species, the ecosystems of the NWHI remain, for the most part, intact. The extensive coral reefs found in Papahānaumokuākea are home to over 7,000 marine species. Of the many species that live here, over 1,700 species of organisms are endemic to the Hawaiian Islands (i.e., they are found nowhere else). For this reason, the region has been dubbed "America's Galápagos".

Though not subject to nearly as much extinction as the main islands, the Leeward Islands have had their share of abuse. From the late 19th to the early 20th centuries, fishermen, guano miners, and feather hunters killed most of the birds and sea life living in the NWHI. Rabbits were introduced to Laysan and Lisianski, where they multiplied and devoured most of the vegetation, permanently extinguishing several species. However, most of the damage was reversed, and the islands were restored largely to their pre-exploitation state.

Important Bird Area
The NWHI has been recognized as an Important Bird Area (IBA) by BirdLife International because of its seabirds and endemic landbirds. The seabird colonies in the IBA form one of the largest assemblages of tropical seabirds in the world, with over 14 million birds of 21 species.

Some of the endemic species of the NWHI include the Nihoa and Laysan finch, the Laysan duck (the "rarest native waterfowl in the United States"), and the Nihoa fan palm. Other notable species are the Laysan albatross, the highly endangered Hawaiian monk seal, and the green sea turtle. The only native trapdoor spiders in the Hawaiian archipelago (Nihoa spp.), recently discovered, are found here. Most endemic species are highly vulnerable to extinction as one major catastrophic event could wipe out all of the vegetation on each small island. Additionally, seventy percent of all coral reefs in the United States are found here.

Exploration

Archeological evidence suggests ancient Hawaiians visited but did not live on Mokumanamana (Necker) and French Frigate Shoals, and the islands were deserted when Europeans arrived in the 18th century. Agricultural terraces indicate Hawaiians lived on Nihoa for extended periods of time. Mokumanamana lacks vegetation and is unsuitable for agriculture, and archeological studies indicate early Hawaiians only visited and used the island for religious purposes.

The first of the Leeward Isles to be discovered by Europeans was Nihoa. James Colnett discovered it in 1786, although historically the credit has gone to William Douglas. Later that year, La Pérouse discovered Necker, and named it for Jacques Necker, the French Minister of Finance. La Pérouse then went on to discover French Frigate Shoals. The last of the NWHI to be discovered was Midway Atoll, which was found by N.C. Middlebrooks in 1859. In 1925, the Tanager Expedition travelled to many of the NWHI. The islands were mapped, new species were discovered and described, and the archeological sites on Nihoa and Necker were found.

Naming system
Most of the islands have two names: one in English and one in Hawaiian (indicated in parentheses above). The majority of the Hawaiian names used as alternatives to the English ones were created in modern times; the original names that ancient Hawaiians gave to all of these islands that they encountered prior to Western contact are found in various oli (chants) and moʻolelo (stories).

National Monument

On June 15, 2006, American President George W. Bush issued a public proclamation creating Papahānaumokuākea Marine National Monument under the Antiquities Act of 1906. The Monument encompasses the islands and surrounding waters, forming the largest marine wildlife reserve in the world. President Theodore Roosevelt had declared the Northwestern Hawaiian chain a bird sanctuary in 1909, and the islands had been protected since 2000 with a designation as an 'ecosystem reserve' by President Bill Clinton, but increasing it to national monument status provides unprecedented control.  of ocean was at that time set aside for protection, about the size of the U.S. state of California.

In August 2016, President Barack Obama expanded the area of the monument by roughly four times. The expanded monument was at that time the world's largest marine protected area.

Entry to the Monument is limited through a permit system, jointly administered by NOAA, FWS, and the state of Hawaii. Anyone who comes to the islands must follow stringent procedures designed to prevent any stray species from entering and disrupting the ecosystem. All clothes must be bought new, and kept wrapped until before arrival. In fact, all "soft" items (camera strap, blanket) must be bought new, and all "hard" items (camera, binoculars) must be cleaned thoroughly. Then, every item must be frozen for 48 hours. A new set of equipment must be prepared for each island one is going to, to prevent inter-island species introduction. However, French Frigate Shoals and Midway Atoll are exempted from these rules, as they are deemed too altered by humans already to worry about introducing new species.

See also

 Bibliography of Midway Atoll
 Hawaiian Islands National Wildlife Refuge
 National Register of Historic Places listings in Hawaii § Northwestern Hawaiian Islands
 Desert island
 List of islands

Notes

References
Census Tract 114.98 and Block 1001 (Necker Island), Honolulu County, Hawaii, United States Census Bureau.
.

External links

Interactive Map from the PBS Ocean Adventures site
Navigating Change
National Monument NOAA Webpage
Northwest Hawaiian Islands Multi-Agency Education Project 
 Papahānaumokuākea Marine National Monument Information Management System

 
Geography of Honolulu County, Hawaii
Seabird colonies
Neogene volcanoes
Neogene Oceania
Cenozoic Hawaii
Important Bird Areas of Hawaii
Important Bird Areas of Oceania